Biznes is a newspaper published in Albania. The paper was launched in 2003. It is owned by the Spekter company.

Reference's 

2003 establishments in Albania
Publications established in 2003
Albanian-language newspapers
Newspapers published in Albania